Carlo I Tocco was the hereditary Count palatine of Cephalonia and Zakynthos from 1376, and ruled as the Despot of Epirus from 1411 until his death on July 4, 1429.

Life
Carlo I was the son of Count Leonardo I Tocco of Cephalonia and Leukas by Maddalena de' Buondelmonti, sister of Esau de' Buondelmonti, ruler of Ioannina. Leonardo I Tocco, who was count of Cephalonia from 1357 until his death in 1376, as well as duke of Leukas from 1362, was himself the son of Guglielmo Tocco, governor of Corfu for the Angevins, and Margherita Orsini, sister of Nicholas Orsini and John II Orsini, rulers of Epirus and counts of Cephalonia. In this way, Carlo Tocco inherited a claim to Epirus from both the Orsini and the Buondelmonti. Carlo I succeeded his father  as count of Cephalonia and duke of Leukas on the latter's death in 1376.  He shared power with his brother Leonardo II, who was invested with the island of Zante as appanage in 1399.

Expansion in the Morea

His marriage to Francesca, daughter of the Duke of Athens Nerio I Acciaioli, gave Carlo a claim on Corinth and Megara after Nerio's death, which he seized in 1395.

He intermittently became involved with the affairs of the Principality of Achaea as well: in 1407–1408 his brother Leonardo seized and plundered the fortress of Glarentza, in the northwestern Morea, and in 1421 Carlo bought permanent possession of it from Oliverio Franco, who had seized it from the Achaean prince Centurione II Zaccaria three years earlier. Achaea's main enemy, the Byzantines of the Despotate of the Morea initially seemed content to leave Tocco alone, given their shared hostility against Zaccaria, but war between the two powers was provoked in late 1426, when Tocco's forces seized the animals of Albanian herders during the latter's annual migration from the Byzantine-controlled central uplands to the plain of Elis. In 1427 the Byzantine emperor, John VIII Palaiologos led a campaign against Glarentza, and in the Battle of the Echinades, the Byzantine fleet defeated Tocco's own. This ended Tocco's ability to intervene in the Morea, and his possessions were liquidated in a negotiated settlement, in which John VIII's brother Constantine Palaiologos (later last Byzantine emperor as Constantine XI) married Maddalena Tocco, Carlo's niece, and received Glarentza and the other Tocco territories as her dowry.

Expansion in Epirus

From 1405 Carlo controlled several fortresses on the mainland, including Angelokastro.  He was invited as the successor of his uncle Esau de' Buondelmonti in Ioannina after the rejection of the latter's widow and son in February 1411.  Nevertheless, he had to overcome the determined opposition of the Albanian clans, and in particular of the ruler of Arta, Yaqub Spata.

In spite of a victory over Carlo in 1412, the Albanians failed to take Ioannina.  On the contrary, not long after Maurice died, and Yaqub was killed in battle in 1416, Carlo advanced on Arta and obtained its surrender in 1416.  Arta was entrusted to Carlo's younger brother Leonardo II, and now the Tocchi controlled all major towns in Epirus.  In 1415 he was granted the title despotes by the Byzantine Emperor Manuel II Palaiologos. Moreover, as part of the Byzantine tradition he adopted, he signed all his official letters and decrees in Greek.

Apart from his conflict with the Byzantine rulers of Morea (the Peloponnese) over Elis, Carlo spent the remainder of his reign in relative peace.

Although he had several illegitimate children, he was succeeded by his nephew Carlo II Tocco, the son of Leonardo II. His niece Creusa Tocco (not Maddelena Tocco as was previously thought) married Constantine XI.

Family

Carlo I Tocco had no children from his marriage to Francesca Acciaioli, daughter of Nerio I Acciaioli, Duke of Athens. By a relationship with an unnamed mistress, Carlo had five illegitimate sons:
 Memnone of Acarnania
 Ercole
 Turno
 Antonio
 Orlando of Reniassa

Chronicle of the Tocco

Significant information about Carlo I Tocco is found in Chronicle of the Tocco which was evidently written by one of his contemporaries, covering 1375-1425, including therefore the period of Carlo's rule.

References

Sources

 
 
 
 
 

 
 

1429 deaths
15th-century despots of Epirus
Tocco family
14th-century despots of Epirus
Counts palatine of Cephalonia and Zakynthos
Year of birth unknown